The first cabinet of Ion Ghica was the government of Romania from 11 February to 10 May 1866.

Ministers
The ministers of the cabinet were as follows:

President of the Council of Ministers:
Ion Ghica (11 February - 10 May 1866)
Minister of the Interior: 
Dimitrie Ghica (11 February - 10 May 1866)
Minister of Foreign Affairs: 
Ion Ghica (11 February - 10 May 1866)
Minister of Finance:
(interim) Dimitrie A. Sturdza (11 - 16 February 1866)
Petre Mavrogheni (16 February - 10 May 1866)
Minister of Justice:
Ion C. Cantacuzino (11 February - 10 May 1866)
Minister of War:
Maj. Dimitrie Lecca (11 February - 10 May 1866)
Minister of Religious Affairs:
Constantin A. Rosetti (11 February - 10 May 1866)
Minister of Public Works:
Dimitrie A. Sturdza (11 February - 10 May 1866)

References

Cabinets of Romania
Cabinets established in 1866
Cabinets disestablished in 1866
1866 establishments in Romania
1866 disestablishments in Romania